The following television stations operate on virtual channel 45 in the United States:

 K02QP-D in Chowchilla, California
 K14AR-D in Glasgow, Montana
 K14HC-D in Prescott, Arizona
 K14HG-D in Kingman, Arizona
 K15CR-D in Lake Havasu City, Arizona
 K15MB-D in Kansas City, Missouri
 K16BP-D in Cottonwood, Arizona
 K18CB-D in Bullhead City, Arizona
 K20NX-D in Hilo, Hawaii
 K21OB-D in Lake Charles, Louisiana
 K22MJ-D in Hinsdale, Montana
 K22MQ-D in St. James, Minnesota
 K24NR-D in Amarillo, Texas
 K28CW-D in Flagstaff, Arizona
 K29NC-D in Monroe, Louisiana
 K34KZ-D in Hobbs, New Mexico
 K34QB-D in Vail, Colorado
 K36PL-D in Park City, Utah
 K45CH-D in Fort Peck, Montana
 K45KS-D in Billings, Montana
 KCYM-LD in Des Moines, Iowa
 KDHW-CD in Yakima, Washington
 KDIT-CD in Des Moines, Iowa
 KDIT-LD in Fort Dodge, Iowa
 KEDD-LD in Los Angeles, California
 KFTY-LD in Middletown, California
 KLHU-CD in Lake Havasu City, Arizona
 KOHC-CD in Oklahoma City, Oklahoma
 KQRO-LD in Morgan Hill, California
 KRET-CD in Palm Springs, California
 KRLJ-LD in Joplin, Missouri
 KSHV-TV in Shreveport, Louisiana
 KSKJ-CD in Van Nuys, California
 KURK-LD in Santa Rosa, California/San Francisco, California
 KUTP in Phoenix, Arizona
 KUVI-DT in Bakersfield, California
 KVTX-LD in Victoria, Texas
 KWPL-LD in Santa Fe, New Mexico
 KXCC-LD in Corpus Christi, Texas
 KXLN-DT in Rosenberg, Texas
 W13DP-D in Youngstown, Ohio
 W13DQ-D in Atlanta, Georgia
 W20DF-D in Russellville, Alabama
 W26EX-D in Jacksonville, Florida
 W26EY-D in Manteo, North Carolina
 W29FF-D in Atlantic City, New Jersey
 W30EG-D in Knoxville, Tennessee
 W35DW-D in Greenville, North Carolina
 WBFF in Baltimore, Maryland
 WCWN in Schenectady, New York
 WDRN-LD in Fayetteville, North Carolina
 WELL-LD in Philadelphia, Pennsylvania
 WFUP in Vanderbilt, Michigan
 WFWC-CD in Fort Wayne, Indiana
 WGNM in Macon, Georgia
 WHFT-TV in Miami, Florida
 WHWV-LD in Huntington, West Virginia
 WLCF-LD in Decatur, Illinois
 WMCF-TV in Montgomery, Alabama
 WNEO in Alliance, Ohio
 WNLO-CD in Norfolk, Virginia
 WNMF-LD in Morristown, New Jersey
 WODK-LD in St. Louis, Missouri
 WRGT-TV in Dayton, Ohio
 WTBT-LD in Tampa, Florida
 WTCI in Chattanooga, Tennessee
 WTGL in Leesburg, Florida
 WTPM-LD in Mayaguez-Anasco, Puerto Rico
 WVNC-LD in Watertown, New York
 WVUP-CD in Tallahassee, Florida
 WVWW-LD in Vero Beach, Florida
 WWAT-CD in Charleroi, Pennsylvania
 WXLV-TV in Winston-Salem, North Carolina
 WYME-CD in Gainesville, Florida
 WZTD-LD in Richmond, Virginia

The following stations, which are no longer licensed, formerly operated on virtual channel 45:
 K45KX-D in Weed, California
 KCDR-LD in Cedar Rapids, Iowa
 KHPB-CD in Bastrop, Texas
 KMDK-LD in Jonesboro, Arkansas
 W45DI-D in Juana Diaz, Puerto Rico
 W45DJ-D in Panama City, Florida
 W45ED-D in Clarksdale, Mississippi
 WKDH in Houston, Mississippi
 WMUN-CD in New York, New York
 WWJS-CD in Clarksville, Indiana

References

45 virtual